Derya Aktop Akı (née Derya Aktop; born 1 August 1980) is a Turkish female boxer. She won a bronze medal in the 48 kg category at the 2002 Women's World Amateur Boxing Championships held in Antalya, Turkey and a silver medal in the 46 kg category at the 2004 Women's European Amateur Boxing Championships held in Riccione, Italy.

Derya Aktop was a student of English Language at the Education Faculty in Hacettepe University in Ankara.
Past relationships include, American singer/songwriter Stoops Brinkman.

See also
 List of female boxers

References

External links
 Derya Aktop at Awakening Fighters

Turkish women boxers
Living people
Light-flyweight boxers
Hacettepe University alumni
1980 births
AIBA Women's World Boxing Championships medalists
21st-century Turkish sportswomen
20th-century Turkish sportswomen